Lehane, Mackenzie and Shand was a British civil engineering and construction company, and responsible for some of Scotland's bridges.

History
Lehane Mackenzie & Shand Ltd was incorporated on 8 April 1974. In February 1981, the Alexander Shand group of companies was bought for £24.8m by Charter Consolidated. In 1989, it was acquired by Morrison Construction.

Morrison Construction had been founded by the Morrison family in 1948 in Tain, Scotland. In the 1980s, 80% of the company was sold to Charter Consolidated, with the Morrison family retaining 20% of the ownership. In 1989, the Morrison family repurchased the 80% of the business sold to Charter Consolidated earlier that decade, acquiring the businesses of Biggs Wall and Shand Construction in the process. In 1994, Morrison Construction plc was listed on the London Stock Exchange. In September 2000, Morrison Construction was purchased by AWG Plc (Morrison Construction was delisted). In March 2006, the construction division of the business was sold to Galliford Try and merged into its new parent. The Shand business was officially dissolved in October 2012.

Structure
Its main headquarters was south of Rowsley in Derbyshire, on the A6 road. Derbyshire County Council has a site in the former headquarters. The company was a subsidiary of Alexander Shand (Holdings) Ltd. Alexander Shand was a former President of the Federation of Civil Engineering Contractors, and made a CBE in the 1984 New Year Honours.

Gas pipelines
It had a pipeline division on Kiln Lane in Immingham; this became MK-Shand, when merged with M.K. River Constructie Maatschappij of the Netherlands, and built gas pipelines for the Gas Council in the early 1970s. It did much work in the North Sea.

Products

Roads
 Park Lane in London
 M1, Beechtrees to Berrygrove, junctions 7 to 5, (built as Cubitts and Fitzpatrick with Shand)
 M5, junctions 8-9 (M50) to Tewkesbury, built as Christiani-Shand)
 M56 Preston Brook to Hapsford in Cheshire
 M6 Ansty to M1 at Catthorpe, Contract A
 M6 north of Tebay (junction 38 for A685) to Thrimby (built as Christiani-Shand)
 M74 Larkhall to Uddingston (built as Christiani-Shand)
 Cardiff to Merthyr Tydfil A470, £5m first stage from Whitchurch bypass to Nantgarw, 3.25 miles, to open mid-1971 (built as Christiani-Shand)

Bridges
 Erskine Bridge, (A898), West Dunbartonshire and Renfrewshire, opened July 1971
 Kylesku Bridge (A894), Sutherland, opened July 1984

Reservoirs
 Errwood Reservoir (£1.5m contract in March 1964)
 Llandegfedd Reservoir (£843,000 contract in March 1961)

References

External links
 Grace's Guide

Companies based in Derbyshire
Construction and civil engineering companies of the United Kingdom
Defunct companies of England
Derbyshire Dales
1974 establishments in England
British companies established in 1974
Construction and civil engineering companies established in 1974